Lover's Lake killifish (Fundulus relictus) is a rare, threatened species of killifish endemic to the Atlantic archipelago of Bermuda, an overseas territory of the United Kingdom. It was formerly described alongside its relatives as abundant throughout the islands' wetland communities, but it has declined and is now found in only a few freshwater, brackish, and saline ponds, including Bartram's Pond and Lover's Lake. It is presumably descended from the F. heteroclitus - F. grandis species complex found on the Atlantic coast of North America. It shares the island chain with the related Bermuda killifish, another killifish species also endemic to a few ponds, and was formerly synonymized with it. Other killifish populations on the islands also seem to be distinct and may also be separate species. Despite this, no pond in Bermuda has been found to contain multiple killifish species together. While most of the ponds containing the killifish's populations are protected as nature reserves, they are often located near areas of high development, leading to risk of pollution. It is also threatened by native predators such as diamondback terrapins, reintroduced yellow-crowned night herons, and other birds, as well as introduced predators such as red-eared sliders and eastern mosquitofish.

References 

Lover's lake killifish
Endemic fauna of Bermuda
Endangered fauna of North America
Lover's Lake killifish